The Baltimore American Indian Center, Inc. (BAIC) is a center for American Indians that is located in Upper Fell's Point, Baltimore, Maryland. The center was founded in 1968 as the "American Indian Study Center" to serve the growing Native American community in Baltimore.  In 2011, the Center reestablished its museum for American Indian heritage.

The center hosts the Native American After School Art Program, founded by community artist and Lumbee Tribal member Ashley Minner in 2007.

In 2015, local artist Dean Tonto Cox, grandson of one of the founders of the Baltimore American Indian Center, Elizabeth Locklear, repainted an outside mural of the center.

References

External links
Official website of the BAIC
Tapping roots of American Indian heritage at Timonium powwow
Center gives Lumbees a sense of community
 Ashley Minner bio

1968 establishments in Maryland
Ethnic groups in Baltimore
Lumbee
Native American organizations
Native Americans in Maryland
Non-profit organizations based in Maryland
Organizations based in Baltimore
Upper Fell's Point, Baltimore
Organizations established in 1968